Joe Batt's Arm is a community in the Canadian province of Newfoundland and Labrador, located on Fogo Island. It was previously incorporated as a town named Joe Batt's Arm-Barr'd Islands-Shoal Bay prior to becoming part of the Town of Fogo Island through an amalgamation in 2011. The former town had a population of 778 in the Canada 2006 Census. This makes it the largest community on the island.

See also 
List of cities and towns in Newfoundland and Labrador

External links 
Folklore and Oral History collection from Joe Batt's Arm
Town of Fogo Island

References 

Populated coastal places in Canada
Populated places in Newfoundland and Labrador
Fogo Island, Newfoundland and Labrador
Populated places disestablished in 2011
Road-inaccessible communities of Newfoundland and Labrador